Great Eastern may refer to:


Transport
 , a steamship built by Isambard Kingdom Brunel in 1858, the largest ship of its era
 Great Eastern Railway, a defunct English railway company formed in 1862
 First Great Eastern, a defunct train operating company on the Great Eastern Main Line
 Great Eastern Main Line, a British railway line
 The Great Eastern, a bridge laying tank of World War II

Arts and entertainment
 The Great Eastern (radio show), that ran from 1994 to 1999 on CBC Radio One
 The Great Eastern (album), a 2000 album by the Scottish band The Delgados
 The Great Eastern (Rodman novel), a 2019 novel by Howard A. Rodman 
 The Great Eastern (Embirikos novel), by Andreas Embirikos

Other uses
 Great Eastern Hotel (disambiguation)
 Great Eastern Life, an insurance company in Singapore and Malaysia

See also
 Great Easton (disambiguation)
 Grand Est (Great East), a region in France